Joseph Henry Tayler (February 7, 1859May 25, 1959) was an American banker and Republican politician from the U.S. state of Wisconsin.  He was the 29th mayor of Green Bay, Wisconsin, and the 9th mayor of Fort Howard, Wisconsin.  In 1932, he was one of several bank officers criminally charged for embezzlement and participating in a fraud to conceal the financial condition of the McCartney National Bank of —he ultimately served four years in federal prison.  His name was frequently abbreviated as J. H. Tayler, and his last name is often misspelled Taylor.

Early life and career
Joseph Tayler was born in Fort Howard, Wisconsin, on February 7, 1859.  He lived nearly his entire life in this area, and Fort Howard was absorbed into the city of Green Bay in 1895.  During his youth, his father was postmaster at Fort Howard, and he began his working life as an assistant postmaster to his father—working in that capacity for ten years.  During this time, he also served two years as city treasurer, an office that his father also held at one time.

In 1881, he went into business with David McCartney in forming the McCartney Exchange Bank.  McCartney was president of the bank and Tayler served as comptroller.  This organization continued until they re-incorporated as the McCartney National Bank, with the same officers, in 1892.  Tayler remained affiliated as an officer of the McCartney National Bank for nearly 50 years, during which time he also served as an officer of the Farmers' and Traders' Bank of Wrightstown.  He also became a director of the Fort Howard Water Works Company in the 1890s, which supplied drinking water to the city.

Political career

Throughout his business career, Tayler was active in local politics with the Republican Party of Wisconsin.  He was elected to two consecutive terms as mayor of Fort Howard in 1889 and 1890.  Fort Howard was absorbed into the city of Green Bay in 1895, and Tayler was subsequently elected to a two-year term as mayor of Green Bay in 1902, defeating the incumbent mayor Simon J. Murphy, Jr.  Tayler did not run for re-election in 1904.

Embezzlement charges

In the midst of the Great Depression, by 1931, Tayler had served as an officer of the McCartney National Bank for nearly 50 years, had recently ended a term as president of the bank, and was then serving as chairman of the board.  His long-time colleague George A. Richardson had been elected president of the bank in January of that year.  Richardson suddenly committed suicide four months later, on May 21, 1931.  A week later the bank failed and was placed under the authority of federal bank regulators.

As the bank's books were examined, attention fell on the officers, several of whom were eventually indicted.  Tayler was charged by the federal government that he embezzled at least $600,000 from the bank for himself and for companies he was invested in.  He was arrested from a hospital bed in Oconomowoc, Wisconsin, where doctors claimed he was suffering from a heart lesion.

Tayler was ultimately convicted and sentenced to ten years in federal prison.  He served four years in Leavenworth before being paroled in 1936.

He returned to Green Bay and obtained employment as a bookkeeper for a grocery business, where he worked until age 93.

Personal life and family

J. H. Tayler was the youngest of at least six children born to Joseph Tayler and his wife Melissa Victorine ( Kennan).

J. H. Tayler married Eleanor J. Richardson on June 27, 1889.  They had two children together, though their first child died in infancy.  Taylor lived to age 100, dying at his home in Green Bay on May 25, 1959.

Electoral history

Green Bay Mayor (1902)

| colspan="6" style="text-align:center;background-color: #e9e9e9;"| General Election, April 1, 1902

External links

References

1859 births
1959 deaths
Mayors of Green Bay, Wisconsin
Wisconsin Republicans
American centenarians
Men centenarians
American bank presidents
American white-collar criminals